() was a futuristic prototype concept  electric cyclecar designed in 1938, and built in 1942 by industrial designer Paul Arzens (1903-1990). It was acquired by the Musée des Arts et Métiers in Paris in 1993, and is currently at the Cité de l'Automobile in Mulhouse in Alsace.

History 
Arzens, a Parisian, and graduate of École nationale supérieure des Beaux-Arts de Paris, designed this futuristic, economical, lightweight electric car prototype in 1938 (along with his concept car La Baleine), then built it in 1942, during World War II.

Car 
The spherical bodywork, with a fastback rear, is inspired by interwar cyclecars, and the bionic shapes of an egg, a bubble, or a drop of water. The body is aluminum, over a chassis formed from a  tube. The windscreen is made of curved Plexiglass, as are the doors. Batteries account for most of the car's  weight.

Motorisation 
To circumvent fuel rationing during the German military administration in occupied France during World War II, Arzens used an electric motor, which was powered by five 12-volt batteries located under the bench seat.

After the war, Arzens replaced the electric motor with a  Peugeot single-cylinder petrol engine, which produced .

Museum 
Arzens used  as his personal car until his death in 1990, at which point it was donated to the Musée des Arts et Métiers in Paris, which houses the collection of the Conservatoire national des arts et métiers. As of 2022, the car is at the Cité de l'Automobile in Mulhouse, together with La Baleine.

References

External links 
 

1940s cars
Electric cars
Concept cars
Cars of France
Cyclecars
Individual cars